Madhurjya Haldar  is an Indian politician belonging to the Communist Party of India (Marxist) and was elected from Mathurapur, West Bengal to the Lok Sabha, lower house of the Parliament of India.

References

1934 births
People from West Bengal
India MPs 1971–1977
Lok Sabha members from West Bengal
Living people
People from South 24 Parganas district